Taras Ruslanovych Moroz (born 21 February 1996) is a Ukrainian professional footballer who plays as a defensive midfielder for Ukrainian club Nyva Ternopil.

References

External links
 
 

1996 births
Living people
People from Velyki Birky
Ukrainian footballers
Association football midfielders
FC Sevastopol players
FC Nyva Ternopil players
Ukrainian First League players
Ukrainian Second League players
Ukrainian Amateur Football Championship players
Sportspeople from Ternopil Oblast